Baramidze or in German transcriptions also as Baramidse is a Georgian family name which – apart from the cities of  Tbilisi and Batumi – is most frequently to be found in the southwestern Guria and Adjara regions of Georgia. Most Baramidzes live in the Tbilisi (846), Batumi (525), Ozurgeti (312), Lanchkhuti (219) and Chokhatauri (209) districts.

Notable members 
David Baramidze (born 1988), German chess Grandmaster of Georgian descent
Giorgi Baramidze (born 1968), Georgian politician

References 

Surnames of Georgian origin
Georgian-language surnames